Myriophora alexandrae is a parasitic insect from the genus Myriophora. Myriophora are flies that kill their definitive host, millipedes.

Geographic distribution 
This is a "new world" parasite that has been found in the Southwestern part of the United States, and Central America specifically, Costa Rica

Attraction to host's natural defense 
Myriophora are initially attracted to the chemical toxin released by their host that is used to keep predators away. However, this same toxin is what attracts the Myriophora. Specifically, the flies are more attracted when 2-methoxy-3-methyl-1,4-benzoquinone is combined with another chemical 2-methyl-1,4-benzoquinone.

Morphology 
An adult female body length ranges form 1.54-1.93 mm. Each adult has one ovipositor located on the posterior end of the parasite that is a needle like shape. It has two wings and each wing ranges from 1.4-1.96mm in length. The top half of the parasite is brown and the bottom half is white.

Life cycle 
When an adult female Myriophora  locates a millipede, it uses its ovipositor to penetrate the millipede in an unprotected areas (e.g. base of the antennae, between body segments, and the unprotected underbelly) of the millipede. An egg is delivered through the ovipositor and hatches inside of the millipede. Once the egg hatches, the maggot ingests the insides of the millipede a process that takes approximately five days. Once the millipede is fully consumed, all that will be left is the hind-gut and the exuvia. The Myriophora maggot  then metamorphoses into an adult fly.

References 

Phoridae
Insects described in 2015